The Cork & Bandon 0-6-0 Beyer saddle tank was a class of five six-coupled locomotives supplied to the Cork and Bandon Railway (C&BR) (later Cork, Bandon and South Coast Railway — CB&SCR) between 1881 and 1894 by Beyer, Peacock & Company.  They were, for a short while on introduction, to be the railway's principle motive power.

History
from 1864, in what Shepherd describes as the C&BR's "second phase" of locomotive procurement, the C&BR had elected to predominately to purchase second-hand engines, with arguably results being less than successful overall.

At the time of their introduction they became the prime motive power of the Railway, displacing  types that had previously fulfilled this role.

When the CB&SCR was amalgamated to the Great Southern Railways in 1924–5 the locomotives were allocated new numbers: from 5, 6, 12, 16, and 17 to 475, 472, 474, 476, and 473 respectively. The GSR was to withdraw 474 and 476 immediately; 472, 473 and 475 being allocated different class numbers J24, J22 and J21 on the basis of all three having slightly different wheel diameters.  The original engine, No. 6/475 had been rebuilt in 1922 and was the last to be withdrawn in 1940.

Post-withdrawal no. 475 was used for boiler washouts at Broadstone, Dublin until scrapped in 1945; no. 472 has also performed the same role at Inchicore before it too was scrapped.

Design
The five locomotives were supplied over a 13-year period and ordered by 3 separate engineers, Conran(2), Johnston(1), and Johnston's son(2); the result being a number of design differences. The first, No. 6, had Ramsbottom valves until rebuilt in 1922 with Salter valves like the remainder. There were also variations in bunkers, cabs, and external boiler fittings. The class, as supplied, had a sloped smokebox door.

Fleet

References

Footnotes

Sources
 
 
 

Beyer, Peacock locomotives
0-6-0ST locomotives
Steam locomotives of Ireland
5 ft 3 in gauge locomotives
Railway locomotives introduced in 1881
Scrapped locomotives